Raido Kodanipork (born 8 May 1969) is an Estonian former cyclist. He competed at the 1992 Summer Olympics and the 1996 Summer Olympics.

References

External links
 

1969 births
Living people
Estonian male cyclists
Olympic cyclists of Estonia
Cyclists at the 1992 Summer Olympics
Cyclists at the 1996 Summer Olympics
Sportspeople from Tallinn